Dalen is a railway station located in Dalen, Netherlands. The station was opened on 1 November 1905 and is located on the Emmerlijn (Zwolle - Emmen). Train services are operated by Arriva. The station was closed between 2 October 1938 and 10 June 1940, 17 September 1944 and 27 June 1945 and 14 May 1950 and 31 May 1987.

Train services

Bus services

There is no bus service at this station. The nearest bus stop is in the village centre of Dalen.

External links
NS website 
Dutch Public Transport journey planner

See also
 List of railway stations in Drenthe

Coevorden
Railway stations in Drenthe
Railway stations opened in 1905
Railway stations on the Emmerlijn
1905 establishments in the Netherlands
Railway stations in the Netherlands opened in the 20th century